Amplitude Studios SASU is a French video game developer based in Paris. The studio was founded in January 2011 by former Ubisoft employees  Romain de Waubert de Genlis and Mathieu Girard, and was acquired by Sega in June 2016. Amplitude is now a part of Sega West, which also comprises Creative Assembly, Sports Interactive and Relic Entertainment.

History 
Amplitude Studios focuses primarily on the development of titles for the personal computer (PC), and uses Steam's Early Access programme, as well as Games2Gether, a crowd-sourcing and voting platform developed by Amplitude Studios, for players to suggest and vote on design choices that should be taken into games from Amplitude Studios, to create a player-centered experience.

In July 2016, Sega announced that they had acquired Amplitude Studios in order to expand their reach on the PC gaming market. Founders Girard and de Waubert de Genlis stated that they agreed on the deal as they saw the opportunity to work alongside other Sega-owned studios, such as Creative Assembly and Relic Entertainment.

Games developed

Accolades 
 Finalist for "Independent Studio" award at the Develop Awards 2015.

References

External links 
 

Video game development companies
Video game companies established in 2011
Video game companies of France
Sega divisions and subsidiaries
2016 mergers and acquisitions
Companies based in Paris
French companies established in 2011